Artur Valentynovych Bybik (born 27 July 2021) is a Ukrainian professional footballer who plays as a midfielder for FC Chernihiv in the Ukrainian First League.

Career
Artur Bybik was a pupil of Yunist Chernihiv, from 2012 to 2018. From 2017 to 2018, he played on loan for Kolos in Chernihiv Oblast in the youth championship.

FC Chernihiv
In September 2020, he moved to FC Chernihiv in the Ukrainian Second League. On 17 October he made his debut against  Bukovyna in the 2020–21 Ukrainian Second League season. On 18 August 2021 he made his debut in the Ukrainian Cup against Chaika Petropavlivska Borshchahivka, helping his team into the third preliminary round for the first time in club history.

Career statistics

Club

References

External links
 Artur Bybik at FC Chernihiv 
 
 

2001 births
Living people
Footballers from Chernihiv
Ukrainian footballers
Association football midfielders
FC Yunist Chernihiv players
FC Chernihiv players
Ukrainian Second League players
Ukrainian First League players